The 1947 Wayne Tartars football team represented Wayne University (later renamed Wayne State University) as an independent during the 1947 college football season. In its second season under head coach John P. Hackett, the team compiled a 5–2 record. The team divided its home games between the University of Detroit Stadium and Keyworth Stadium.

John Hazeley led the team with 475 rushing yards and was selected as the team's most valuable player. Allen Griffiths and Stephen Zukowski were the team captains.

Schedule

References

Wayne
Wayne State Warriors football seasons
Wayne Tartars football